Air3 Radio is the student radio station of the University of Stirling. Air3 Radio broadcasts a full schedule during normal semester dates (September - December and February - May) and a limited number of shows within holiday and exam periods.

The station currently has shows running from 07:00 - 03:00, 7 days a week.

History
Radio Airthrey was set up in the early 1970s as Scotland's first campus-based student radio station. The station was later rebranded as 'Air3 1350' and most recently 'Air3 Radio' reflecting the change in technology and broadcasting technique. The student radio station was a highly recommended club for University of Stirling Students.  However, once the COVID-19 pandemic began memberships were in short supply.  In May of 2022, a new committee began making preparations to revitalize the society from the ground up in its first redevelopment since 2009.

Committee 
Air3 Radio is made up of almost 170 members and contributors. Throughout the year they present shows, produce live broadcast and sessions, interview bands, and create features to educate and inform the public and students alike.

There is a strong music team that deals with all aspects of label communication and processes, reviews, playlists and gives feedback to musicians both signed and unsigned from all over the world.

In keeping with the University of Stirling Student Union Constitution, the Air3 Radio Society is run by an elected committee.

The current station manager is Tanner Mulay.

Past members
Many members of Air3 have gone on to have successful careers within radio and the wider creative media industries, they include:

 Greg McHugh – Gary: Tank Commander (TV Show)
 Ally McCrae – Former BBC Radio 1 - Nations programming
 Michael Hines – Director of Still Game

See also
 Student Radio Association

References

External links
 Air3 live webstream

Student radio in the United Kingdom
University of Stirling